Norman Wilson may refer to:

 Norman D. Wilson (engineer) (1884–1967), Canadian transportation engineer
 Norman D. Wilson (actor) (1938-2004), American actor
 Norman Frank Wilson (1876–1956), Canadian farmer and political figure
 Norman Wilson (graphic designer) (1931-1991), English graphic designer
 Norman Wilson (rugby union) (1922–2001), New Zealand rugby union player
 Norman Wilson (The Wire), fictional character on the television drama The Wire
 Norm Wilson (1927–2011), Australian rules footballer 
 Norm Wilson (cricketer) (1931–2018), New Zealand cricketer
 Norman Wilson (baseball) for Hopkinsville Hoppers

See also
 A. N. Wilson (Andrew Norman Wilson, born 1950), English writer and newspaper columnist
 Andrew Norman Wilson (artist) (born 1983), American artist and curator